Dawbarn is a surname. Notable people with the surname include:

H. Dunlop Dawbarn (1915–1998), American businessman and politician 
Elizabeth Dawbarn (died 1839), English nurse and pamphleteer
Mary Campbell Dawbarn (1902–1982), Australian biochemist 
Spike Dawbarn (born 1974), English singer and dancer
Wilbur Dawbarn, British comics artist and cartoonist